Bruce Rhodes (April 17, 1952 – February 23, 1981) was an American football defensive back. He played for the San Francisco 49ers in 1976 and for the Detroit Lions in 1978.

He was shot and killed on February 23, 1981, in San Francisco, California at age 28.

References

1952 births
1981 deaths
American football defensive backs
San Francisco State Gators football players
San Francisco 49ers players
Detroit Lions players
American murder victims
Male murder victims
People murdered in California
Deaths by firearm in California